Aaron Harding (February 20, 1805 – December 24, 1875) was a United States representative from Kentucky and a slaveholder. He was born near Campbellsville, in what is now Green County, where he attended rural schools. He became familiar with the classics, studied law, was admitted to the bar in 1833, having commenced his practice in Greensburg, Kentucky. He was also known as Aaron Hardin.

Harding was elected prosecuting attorney of Green County in 1833. He was member of the Kentucky House of Representatives in 1840 and was elected as a Unionist to the Thirty-seventh and Thirty-eighth Congresses and as a Democrat to the Thirty-ninth Congress (March 4, 1861 – March 3, 1867). He was a delegate to the Union National Convention in 1866. After leaving Congress, he resumed the practice of law in Danville, Kentucky. He died in Georgetown, Kentucky, in 1875 and was interred at Georgetown Cemetery there.

References

Further reading

1805 births
1875 deaths
People from Green County, Kentucky
Unionist Party members of the United States House of Representatives from Kentucky
Kentucky Unionists
Democratic Party members of the United States House of Representatives from Kentucky
Democratic Party members of the Kentucky House of Representatives
Politicians from Danville, Kentucky
People from Greensburg, Kentucky
19th-century American politicians